The Kingdom of England existed on the island of Great Britain from 12 July 927, when it unified from various Anglo-Saxon kingdoms, until 1 May 1707, when it united with Scotland to form the Kingdom of Great Britain.

In 927, the various Anglo-Saxon kings swore their allegiance to Æthelstan of Wessex, unifying most of modern England under a single king. In 1016, the kingdom became part of the North Sea Empire of Cnut the Great, a personal union between England, Denmark and Norway. The Norman conquest of England in 1066 led to the transfer of the English capital city and chief royal residence from the Anglo-Saxon one at Winchester to Westminster, and the City of London quickly established itself as England's largest and principal commercial centre.

Histories of the kingdom of England from the Norman conquest of 1066 conventionally distinguish periods named after successive ruling dynasties: Norman (1066–1154), Plantagenet (1154–1485), Tudor (1485–1603) and Stuart (1603–1707, interrupted by the Interregnum of 1649–1660). Dynastically, all English monarchs after 1066 ultimately claim descent from the Normans; the distinction of the Plantagenets is merely conventional, beginning with Henry II as from that time, the Angevin kings became "more English in nature"; the houses of Lancaster and York are both Plantagenet cadet branches, the Tudor dynasty claimed descent from Edward III via John Beaufort and James VI and I of the House of Stuart claimed descent from Henry VII via Margaret Tudor.

Following the conquest of England, the Normans gradually sought to extend their conquests both to the remainder of the British Isles and additional lands on the Continent, particularly in modern-day France. Over time, this would evolve into a long-standing policy of expansionism pursued intermittently with steadily increasing levels of aggression by successive, now-styled "English", dynasties. Beginning in the 12th century, the Normans began making serious incursions into Ireland. The completion of the conquest of Wales by Edward I in 1284 put Wales under the control of the English crown, although Edward's attempts to completely subjugate Ireland met with very limited success while the initial success of his conquest of Scotland was undone by English military defeat under his son, Edward II. Edward III transformed the Kingdom of England into one of the most formidable military powers in Europe; his reign also saw vital developments in legislation and government—in particular the evolution of the English parliament. From the 1340s the kings of England also laid claim to the crown of France, but after the Hundred Years' War the English lost all their land on the continent, except for Calais. The subsequent outbreak of the Wars of the Roses in 1455 would ensure the English were never again in a position to seriously pursue their French claims.

After the turmoil of the Wars of the Roses, the Tudor dynasty ruled during the English Renaissance and again extended English monarchical power beyond England proper, in particular achieving the full union of England and the Principality of Wales in 1542. The Tudors also secured English control of Ireland, although it would continue to be ruled as a separate kingdom in personal union with England for centuries. Henry VIII triggered the English Reformation by breaking communion between the Church of England and the Roman Catholic Church, although the doctrinal aspects of the Reformation which established the English Church as being recognizably Protestant would not be pursued in earnest until the brief reign of his young son Edward VI. Following a return to Catholicism under the similarly brief reign of Henry's eldest daughter Mary I, Mary's half-sister Elizabeth I re-established Protestantism under the terms of the Elizabethan Religious Settlement, meanwhile establishing England as a great power and laying the foundations of the British Empire by claiming possessions in the New World. While Henry also pursued an aggressive foreign policy north of the border in an attempt to subjugate Scotland, Elizabeth adopted a much more conciliatory position especially in light of developments such as Scotland's own Reformation and the eventual certainty that the Scottish monarch would succeed Elizabeth.

From the accession of James VI and I in 1603, the Stuart dynasty ruled England and Ireland in personal union with Scotland. Under the Stuarts, the kingdom plunged into civil war, which culminated in the execution of Charles I in 1649. The monarchy returned in 1660, but the Civil War had established the precedent that an English monarch cannot govern without the consent of Parliament. This concept became legally established as part of the Glorious Revolution of 1688. From this time the Kingdom of England, as well as its successor states the Kingdom of Great Britain and the United Kingdom, have functioned in effect as a constitutional monarchy. On 1 May 1707, under the terms of the Acts of Union 1707, the kingdoms of England and Scotland united to form the aforementioned Kingdom of Great Britain.

Name

The Anglo-Saxons referred to themselves as the Engle or the Angelcynn, originally names of the Angles. They called their land Engla land, meaning "land of the English", 
by Æthelweard Latinized Anglia, from an original Anglia vetus, the purported homeland of the Angles (called Angulus by Bede). The name Engla land became England by haplology during the Middle English period (Engle-land, Engelond). The Latin name was Anglia or Anglorum terra, the Old French and Anglo-Norman one Engleterre. By the 14th century, England was also used in reference to the entire island of Great Britain.

Cnut the Great, a Dane, was the first to call himself "King of England". In 1604 James I, who had inherited the English throne the previous year, adopted the title (now usually rendered in English rather than Latin) King of Great Britain. The English and Scottish parliaments, however, did not recognise this title until the Acts of Union of 1707.

History

Anglo-Saxon England

The kingdom of England emerged from the gradual unification of the early medieval Anglo-Saxon kingdoms known as the Heptarchy: East Anglia, Mercia, Northumbria, Kent, Essex, Sussex, and Wessex. The Viking invasions of the 9th century upset the balance of power between the English kingdoms, and native Anglo-Saxon life in general. The English lands were unified in the 10th century in a reconquest completed by King Æthelstan in 927.

During the Heptarchy, the most powerful king among the Anglo-Saxon kingdoms might become acknowledged as Bretwalda, a high king over the other kings. The decline of Mercia allowed Wessex to become more powerful, absorbing the kingdoms of Kent and Sussex in 825. The kings of Wessex increasingly dominated the other kingdoms of England during the 9th century. In 827, Northumbria submitted to Egbert of Wessex at Dore, briefly making Egbert the first king to reign over a united England.

In 886, Alfred the Great retook London, which he apparently regarded as a turning point in his reign. The Anglo-Saxon Chronicle says that "all of the English people (all Angelcyn) not subject to the Danes submitted themselves to King Alfred." Asser added that "Alfred, king of the Anglo-Saxons, restored the city of London splendidly ... and made it habitable once more." Alfred's restoration entailed reoccupying and refurbishing the nearly deserted Roman walled city, building quays along the Thames, and laying a new city street plan. It is probably at this point that Alfred assumed the new royal style 'King of the Anglo-Saxons.'

During the following years Northumbria repeatedly changed hands between the English kings and the Norwegian invaders, but was definitively brought under English control by Eadred in 954, completing the unification of England. At about this time, Lothian, bordering the northern portion of Northumbria (Bernicia), was ceded to the Kingdom of Scotland. On 12 July 927 the monarchs of Britain gathered at Eamont in Cumbria to recognise Æthelstan as king of the English. This can be considered England's 'foundation date', although the process of unification had taken almost 100 years.

England has remained in political unity ever since. During the reign of Æþelræd the Unready (978–1016), a new wave of Danish invasions was orchestrated by Sweyn I of Denmark, culminating after a quarter-century of warfare in the Danish conquest of England in 1013. But Sweyn died on 2 February 1014, and Æþelræd was restored to the throne. In 1015, Sweyn's son Cnut the Great (commonly known as Canute) launched a new invasion. The ensuing war ended with an agreement in 1016 between Canute and Æþelræd's successor, Edmund Ironside, to divide England between them, but Edmund's death on 30 November of that year left England united under Danish rule. This continued for 26 years until the death of Harthacnut in June 1042. He was the son of Canute and Emma of Normandy (the widow of Æþelræd the Unready) and had no heirs of his own; he was succeeded by his half-brother, Æþelræd's son, Edward the Confessor. The Kingdom of England was once again independent.

Norman conquest

The peace lasted until the death of the childless Edward in January 1066. His brother-in-law was crowned King Harold, but his cousin William the Conqueror, Duke of Normandy, immediately claimed the throne for himself. William launched an invasion of England and landed in Sussex on 28 September 1066. Harold and his army were in York following their victory against the Norwegians at the Battle of Stamford Bridge (25 September 1066) when the news reached him. He decided to set out without delay and confront the Norman army in Sussex so marched southwards at once, despite the army not being properly rested following the battle with the Norwegians. The armies of Harold and William faced each other at the Battle of Hastings (14 October 1066), in which the English army, or Fyrd, was defeated, Harold and his two brothers were slain, and William emerged as victor. William was then able to conquer England with little further opposition. He was not, however, planning to absorb the Kingdom into the Duchy of Normandy. As a mere duke, William owed allegiance to Philip I of France, whereas in the independent Kingdom of England he could rule without interference. He was crowned on 25 December 1066 in Westminster Abbey, London.

High Middle Ages

In 1092, William II led an invasion of Strathclyde, a Celtic kingdom in what is now southwest Scotland and Cumbria. In doing so, he annexed what is now the county of Cumbria to England. In 1124, Henry I ceded what is now southeast Scotland (called Lothian) to the Kingdom of Scotland, in return for the King of Scotland's loyalty. This final cession established what would become the traditional borders of England which have remained largely unchanged since then (except for occasional and temporary changes). This area of land had previously been a part of the Anglian Kingdom of Northumbria. Lothian contained what later became the Scottish capital, Edinburgh. This arrangement was later finalized in 1237 by the Treaty of York.

The Duchy of Aquitaine came into personal union with the Kingdom of England upon the accession of Henry II, who had married Eleanor, Duchess of Aquitaine. The Kingdom of England and the Duchy of Normandy remained in personal union until John Lackland, Henry II's son and fifth-generation descendant of William I, lost the continental possessions of the Duchy to Philip II of France in 1204. A few remnants of Normandy, including the Channel Islands, remained in John's possession, together with most of the Duchy of Aquitaine.

Conquest of Wales

Up until the Norman conquest of England, Wales had remained for the most part independent of the Anglo-Saxon kingdoms, although some Welsh kings did sometimes acknowledge the Bretwalda. Soon after the Norman conquest of England, however, some Norman lords began to attack Wales. They conquered and ruled parts of it, acknowledging the overlordship of the Norman kings of England but with considerable local independence. Over many years these "Marcher Lords" conquered more and more of Wales, against considerable resistance led by various Welsh princes, who also often acknowledged the overlordship of the Norman kings of England.

Edward I defeated Llywelyn ap Gruffudd, and so effectively conquered Wales, in 1282. He created the title Prince of Wales for his heir, the future Edward II, in 1301. Edward I's conquest was brutal and the subsequent repression considerable, as the magnificent Welsh castles such as Conwy, Harlech, and Caernarfon attest; but this event re-united under a single ruler the lands of Roman Britain for the first time since the establishment of the Kingdom of the Jutes in Kent in the 5th century, some 700 years before. Accordingly, this was a highly significant moment in the history of medieval England, as it re-established links with the pre-Saxon past. These links were exploited for political purposes to unite the peoples of the kingdom, including the Anglo-Normans, by popularising Welsh legends.

The Welsh language—derived from the British language, continued to be spoken by the majority of the population of Wales for at least another 500 years, and is still a majority language in parts of the country.

Late Middle Ages

Edward III was the first English king to have a claim to the throne of France. His pursuit of the claim resulted in the Hundred Years' War (1337–1453), which pitted five kings of England of the House of Plantagenet against five kings of France of the Capetian House of Valois. Extensive naval raiding was carried out by all sides during the war, often involving privateers such as John Hawley of Dartmouth or the Castilian Pero Niño. Though the English won numerous victories, they were unable to overcome the numerical superiority of the French and their strategic use of gunpowder weapons. England was defeated at the Battle of Formigny in 1450 and finally at the Battle of Castillon in 1453, retaining only a single town in France, Calais.

During the Hundred Years' War an English identity began to develop in place of the previous division between the Norman lords and their Anglo-Saxon subjects. This was a consequence of sustained hostility to the increasingly nationalist French, whose kings and other leaders (notably the charismatic Joan of Arc) used a developing sense of French identity to help draw people to their cause. The Anglo-Normans became separate from their cousins who held lands mainly in France and mocked the former for their archaic and bastardised spoken French. English also became the language of the law courts during this period.

The kingdom had little time to recover before entering the Wars of the Roses (1455–1487), a series of civil wars over possession of the throne between the House of Lancaster (whose heraldic symbol was the red rose) and the House of York (whose symbol was the white rose), each led by different branches of the descendants of Edward III. The end of these wars found the throne held by the descendant of an initially illegitimate member of the House of Lancaster, married to the eldest daughter of the House of York: Henry VII and Elizabeth of York. They were the founders of the Tudor dynasty, which ruled the kingdom from 1485 to 1603.

Tudor period

Wales retained a separate legal and administrative system, which had been established by Edward I in the late 13th century. The country was divided between the Marcher Lords, who gave feudal allegiance to the crown, and the Principality of Wales. Under the Tudor monarchy, Henry VIII replaced the laws of Wales with those of England (under the Laws in Wales Acts 1535–1542). Wales was incorporated into the Kingdom of England, and henceforth was represented in the Parliament of England.

During the 1530s, Henry VIII overthrew the power of the Roman Catholic Church within the kingdom, replacing the pope as head of the English Church and seizing the Church's lands, thereby facilitating the creation of a variation of Catholicism that became more Protestant over time. This had the effect of aligning England with Scotland, which also gradually adopted a Protestant religion, whereas the most important continental powers, France and Spain, remained Roman Catholic.

In 1541, during Henry VIII's reign, the Parliament of Ireland proclaimed him king of Ireland, thereby bringing the Kingdom of Ireland into personal union with the Kingdom of England.

Calais, the last remaining continental possession of the Kingdom, was lost in 1558, during the reign of Philip and Mary I. Their successor, Elizabeth I, consolidated the new and increasingly Protestant Church of England. She also began to build up the kingdom's naval strength, on the foundations Henry VIII had laid down. By 1588, her new navy was strong enough to defeat the Spanish Armada, which had sought to invade England to put a Catholic monarch on the throne in her place.

Early modern history

The House of Tudor ended with the death of Elizabeth I on 24 March 1603. James I ascended the throne of England and brought it into personal union with the Kingdom of Scotland. Despite the Union of the Crowns, the kingdoms remained separate and independent states: a state of affairs which lasted for more than a century.

Civil War and Interregnum

The Stuart kings overestimated the power of the English monarchy, and were cast down by Parliament in 1645 and 1688. In the first instance, Charles I's introduction of new forms of taxation in defiance of Parliament led to the English Civil War (1641–45), in which the king was defeated, and to the abolition of the monarchy under Oliver Cromwell during the Interregnum of 1649–1660. Henceforth, the monarch could reign only at the will of Parliament.

After the trial and execution of Charles I in January 1649, the Rump Parliament passed an act declaring England to be a Commonwealth on 19 May 1649.  The monarchy and the House of Lords were abolished, and so the House of Commons became a unitary legislative chamber with a new body, the Council of State becoming the executive. However the Army remained the dominant institution in the new republic and the most prominent general was Oliver Cromwell. The Commonwealth fought wars in Ireland and Scotland which were subdued and placed under Commonwealth military occupation.

In April 1653 Cromwell and the other Grandees of the New Model Army, frustrated with the members of the Rump Parliament who would not pass legislation to dissolve the Rump and to allow a new more representative parliament to be elected, stopped the Rump's session by force of arms and declared the Rump dissolved.

After an experiment with a Nominated Assembly (Barebone's Parliament), the Grandees in the Army, through the Council of State imposed a new constitutional arrangement under a written constitution called the Instrument of Government. Under the Instrument of Government executive power lay with a Lord Protector (an office to be held for the life of the incumbent) and there were to be triennial Parliaments, with each sitting for at least five months. Article 23 of the Instrument of Government stated that Oliver Cromwell was to be the first Lord Protector. The Instrument of Government was replaced by a second constitution (the Humble Petition and Advice) under which the Lord Protector could nominate his successor. Cromwell nominated his son Richard who became Lord Protector on the death of Oliver on 3 September 1658.

Restoration and Glorious Revolution

Richard proved to be ineffectual and was unable to maintain his rule. He resigned his title and retired into obscurity. The Rump Parliament was recalled and there was a second period where the executive power lay with the Council of state. But this restoration of Commonwealth rule, similar to that before the Protectorate, proved to be unstable, and the exiled claimant, Charles II, was restored to the throne in 1660.

Following the Restoration of the monarchy in 1660, an attempt by James II to reintroduce Roman Catholicism—a century after its suppression by the Tudors—led to the Glorious Revolution of 1688, in which he was deposed by Parliament. The Crown was then offered by Parliament to James II's Protestant daughter and son-in-law/nephew, William III and Mary II.

Union with Scotland
In the Scottish case, the attractions were partly financial and partly to do with removing English trade sanctions put in place through the Alien Act 1705. The English were more anxious about the royal succession. The death of William III in 1702 had led to the accession of his sister-in-law Anne to the thrones of England and Scotland, but her only surviving child had died in 1700, and the English Act of Settlement 1701 had given the succession to the English crown to the Protestant House of Hanover. Securing the same succession in Scotland became the primary object of English strategic thinking towards Scotland. By 1704, the Union of the Crowns was in crisis, with the Scottish Act of Security allowing for the Scottish Parliament to choose a different monarch, which could in turn lead to an independent foreign policy during a major European war. The English establishment did not wish to risk a Stuart on the Scottish throne, nor the possibility of a Scottish military alliance with another power.

A Treaty of Union was agreed on 22 July 1706, and following the Acts of Union of 1707, which created the Kingdom of Great Britain, the independence of the kingdoms of England and Scotland came to an end on 1 May 1707. The Acts of Union created a customs union and monetary union and provided that any "laws and statutes" that were "contrary to or inconsistent with the terms" of the Acts would "cease and become void".

The English and Scottish Parliaments were merged into the Parliament of Great Britain, located in Westminster, London. At this point England ceased to exist as a separate political entity, and since then has had no national government. The laws of England were unaffected, with the legal jurisdiction continuing to be that of England and Wales, while Scotland continued to have its own laws and law courts. This continued after the 1801 union between the kingdoms of Great Britain and Ireland, forming the United Kingdom of Great Britain and Ireland. In 1922 the Irish Free State seceded from the United Kingdom, leading to the latter being renamed the United Kingdom of Great Britain and Northern Ireland.

Territorial divisions

The counties of England were established for administration by the Normans, in most cases based on earlier shires established by the Anglo-Saxons. They ceased to be used for administration only with the creation of the administrative counties in 1889.

Unlike the partly self-governing boroughs that covered urban areas, the counties of medieval England existed primarily as a means of enforcing central government power, enabling monarchs to exercise control over local areas through their chosen representatives – originally sheriffs and later the lord-lieutenants – and their subordinate justices of the peace.
Counties were used initially for the administration of justice, collection of taxes and organisation of the military, and later for local government and electing parliamentary representation.
Some outlying counties were from time to time accorded palatine status with some military and central government functions vested in a local noble or bishop. The last such, the County Palatine of Durham, did not lose this special status until the 19th century.

Although all of England was divided into shires by the time of the Norman conquest, some counties were formed considerably later, up to the 16th century. Because of their differing origins the counties varied considerably in size. The county boundaries were fairly static between the 16th century Laws in Wales acts and the Local Government Act 1888. Each shire was responsible for gathering taxes for the central government; for local defence; and for justice, through assize courts.

The power of the feudal barons to control their landholding was considerably weakened in 1290 by the statute of Quia Emptores. Feudal baronies became perhaps obsolete (but not extinct) on the abolition of feudal tenure during the Civil War, as confirmed by the Tenures Abolition Act 1660 passed under the Restoration which took away knight-service and other legal rights.
Tenure by knight-service was abolished and discharged and the lands covered by such tenures, including once-feudal baronies, were henceforth held by socage (i.e., in exchange for monetary rents).
The English Fitzwalter Case in 1670 ruled that barony by tenure had been discontinued for many years and any claims to a peerage on such basis, meaning a right to sit in the House of Lords, were not to be revived, nor any right of succession based on them.

The Statute of Rhuddlan in 1284 followed the conquest of Wales by Edward I of England.  It assumed the lands held by the Princes of Gwynedd under the title "Prince of Wales" as legally part of the lands of England, and established shire counties on the English model over those areas. The Marcher Lords were progressively tied to the English kings by the grants of lands and lordships in England. The Council of Wales and the Marches, administered from Ludlow Castle, was initially established in 1472 by Edward IV of England to govern the lands held under the Principality of Wales and the bordering English counties.  It was abolished in 1689.  Under the Laws in Wales Acts 1535–1542 introduced under Henry VIII, the jurisdiction of the marcher lords was abolished in 1536.  The Acts had the effect of annexing Wales to England and creating a single state and legal jurisdiction, commonly referred to as England and Wales.

At the same time the Council of Wales was created in 1472, a Council of the North was set up for the northern counties of England.  After falling into disuse, it was re-established in 1537 and abolished in 1641.  A very short-lived Council of the West also existed for the West Country between 1537 and 1540.

See also

List of English monarchs

Notes

References

Cited works

Further reading 

 
 
 
 
 
 
 
 
 
 
 
 
 
 
 
 
 
 
 
 
 
 

 
1707 disestablishments in Great Britain
Former countries in the British Isles
Former kingdoms
Former monarchies of Europe
10th-century establishments in England
States and territories established in the 920s
States and territories disestablished in 1649
States and territories established in 1660
States and territories disestablished in 1707
927 establishments
Christian states